Bortkevich is a surname. Notable people with the surname include:

 Zenon Bortkevich (1937–2010), Soviet water polo player
Leonid Bortkevich (1949–2021), singer from Pesniary

Russian-language surnames
ru:Борткевич